Verivery (stylized as VERIVERY and also abbreviated VRVR) is a South Korean boy band formed by Jellyfish Entertainment in 2018. They debuted on January 9, 2019 with Veri-Us.

They self-produce their albums and have created several music videos directed and edited by Minchan, along with Verivery members. The group has explained that they take inspiration from other artist's performances, while Gyehyeon describes their process as Minchan drawing from "all the member's various ideas under his leadership".

History

2018: Pre-debut
On August 23, 2018, Jellyfish confirmed that they would be debuting a seven member boy group and later confirmed their name as Verivery, Jellyfish Entertainment's first boy group in six years since VIXX. Their name comes from the Latin word 'veri' meaning 'truth' and the English word 'very', Verivery is a combination of the words ‘various', 'energetic', 'real' and 'innovation'.

Prior to their debut, Mnet revealed that the upcoming group would star in the reality show named Now Verivery: Real Road Movie. On September 21, 2018, the OST "Super Special" for their reality show, as well as its music video, was released along with the debut of the reality show.

On November 9, the group released the DIY MV of Now Verivery OST "Super Special".

2019: Debut with Veri series
On January 9, 2019, the group officially debuted with their first extended play Veri-Us and its lead single "Ring Ring Ring". On February 24, the group released their DIY music video of Veri-Us album for the title song "Ring Ring Ring". 

On April 24, Verivery released their second extended play Veri-Able and its lead single "From Now". On June 1, the group released their DIY music video of Veri-Able album for the title song "From Now". On July 7, the group made their first overseas performance, performing "From Now" at K-CON 2019 in New York. 

On July 31, Verivery released their first single album Veri-Chill and its lead single "Tag Tag Tag". On September 11, the groups released the DIY music video of Veri-Chill album for the combined song "Tag Tag Tag & 반할 수밖에 (Mystery Light)". On August 17-18, Verivery performed "Tag Tag Tag" at K-CON 2019 in Los Angeles.

2020: Face It series, Road to Kingdom
On January 7, Verivery released their third extended play Face Me and its lead single "Lay Back". The EP marks as the first series of the FACE it trilogy. On February 17, the group released the DIY music video for the b-side songs of Face Me album titled "Paradise & Photo".

On March 20, the group was confirmed to join Mnet's reality television competition Road to Kingdom. They released "Beautiful-X" for the show's finale, they placed fifth overall. The group has shared that the show helped them improve their performance abilities, saying they "were determined to become a more hardworking Verivery."

On July 1, Verivery released their fourth extended play Face You and its lead single "Thunder". On August 8, the group released the DIY music video for the combined title track and b-side song "Connect & Thunder" of Face You album.

On October 13, Verivery released their fifth extended play Face Us and its lead single "G.B.T.B. (Go Beyond The Barrier)". They also released a DIY music video for the song "So Gravity" from Face Us album on December 28. On October 26, it was announced that Minchan would be going on a hiatus due to poor health and anxiety issues.
On October 27, the lead single "G.B.T.B." would reach #1 on Billboard'''s World Digital Song Sales.

On December 23, the group released their first holiday track "Love at First Sight".

 2021: Series 'O' Round 1: Hall and Series 'O' Round 2: Hole 
On March 2, the group released their second single album Series 'O' Round 1: Hall and its lead single "Get Away". They shared that this new era, stepping away from the FACE it series, would show more maturity and their "dreamy and critical sexiness that [fans have] never seen before." The group also explained that Series O' Round 1: Hall describes them "enjoying a crazy party at the invitation of someone." The lead single, "Get Away" would then go on to top Billboard's World Digital Song Sales chart for two weeks straight.

On June 1, it was announced that Minchan would be returning to group activities.

On August 23, the group released their sixth extended play, Series 'O' Round 2: Hole and its lead single "Trigger".

Verivery announced their first U.S. tour, taking place from December 5–20, 2021. The shows in Cleveland, Harrisburg, and New York City were cancelled due to Yongseung testing positive for COVID-19.

 2022: Series 'O' Round 0: Who, Series 'O' Round 3: Whole, Japanese Debut, and Liminality – EP.Love
On March 23, the group released the digital single "Series 'O' Round 0: Who" and its lead single "O".

On April 25, the group released their first full-length album Series 'O' Round 3: Whole and its lead single "Undercover".

On June 22, the group made their Japanese debut with the single "Undercover (Japanese ver.)".

In July 2022, it was announced that Verivery had confirmed an international concert tour, from September to October, they will hold a concert in Korea in August.

On November 14, the group released their third single album, Liminality – EP.Love, with the lead single "Tap Tap". Later on November 23, the group successfully took home their first ever music show win with "Tap Tap" on MBC M's Show Champion.
Just two days later, on November 25, VERIVERY would then earn their second music show win for "Tap Tap" on KBS' Music Bank.

Members
Adapted from their Naver profile.
Dongheon (동헌) - leader
Hoyoung (호영)
Minchan (민찬)
Gyehyeon (계현)
Yeonho (연호)
Yongseung (용승)
Kangmin (강민)

Discography
Studio albums

Extended plays

Single albums

Singles

Soundtrack appearances

Other songs

 Filmography 
Reality shows
 Now Verivery: Real Road Movie (지금부터베리베리해)'' (Mnet, 2018)

Music videos

DIY Music videos

Concerts and tours

2021 VERIVERY 1st TOUR IN U.S.

Cancelled shows

2022 VERIVERY CONCERT PAGE:0

Awards and nominations

Notes

References

External links
 Official website 

K-pop music groups
South Korean boy bands
South Korean dance music groups
Musical groups from Seoul
Musical groups established in 2018
2018 establishments in South Korea
South Korean pop music groups
Jellyfish Entertainment artists